Arnicastrum is a genus of flowering plants in the family Asteraceae.

 Species
Both species are endemic to Mexico.
 Arnicastrum glandulosum Greenm. - Chihuahua, Durango
 Arnicastrum guerrerense Villaseñor - Guerrero

References

Tageteae
Asteraceae genera
Endemic flora of Mexico